Lieutenant General John Adlercron (died 31 July 1766) was Commander-in-Chief, India.

Military career
Born into a Huguenot family who had taken refuge in Dublin at the end of the seventeenth century, Adlercron joined the Royal Army: in 1754 he went to India as commanding officer of the 39th (Dorsetshire) Regiment of Foot to protect the interests of the East India Company.

He became Commander-in-Chief, India that year. On 16 May 1758 he was promoted to major-general, and on 18 December 1760 to lieutenant-general.

Adlercron died of an apoplexy in July 1766 at his home at Blackrock in Dublin.

References

1766 deaths
British Commanders-in-Chief of India
39th Regiment of Foot officers
British Army lieutenant generals
Year of birth unknown
Military personnel from Dublin (city)